The 1979–80 season was Manchester City's 78th season of competitive football and 60th season in the top division of English football. In addition to the First Division, the club competed in the FA Cup and Football League Cup.

First Division

League table

Results summary

References

External links

Manchester City F.C. seasons
Manchester City